Omorgus inermis is a species of hide beetle in the subfamily Omorginae and subgenus Afromorgus.

References

inermis
Beetles described in 2005